Andaingo is a genus of moths in the family Limacodidae.

Species include:
Andaingo bicolor, found in Equatorial Guinea
Andaingo ecclesiastica, type species, found in Madagascar Synonym: Macrosemyra ecclesiastica.
Andaingo melampepla
Andaingo rufivena, found in Cameroon

References

Limacodidae genera